Christopher M. Hacker (born November 15, 1999) is an American professional stock car racing driver. He competes part-time in the NASCAR Craftsman Truck Series, driving the No. 30 Toyota Tundra for On Point Motorsports.

Racing career

Early career
In 2008, Hacker started his racing career when he was 8 years old, racing in Quarter Midgets, where he ranked 2nd in his home state. From 2009 to 2011, he competed in the Bandolero bandits, where he won the Indiana state championship in 2010 and 2011. After two championship seasons in Bandoleros, he moved up to the INEX Legend Cars in 2012, where he won the Indianapolis Speedrome Championship in the Young Lions category. In 2013, he moved up from Legend Cars to the Champion Racing Association Sportsman category, where he became the youngest driver to ever to win a CRA event at age 13. He returned to the CRA for 2014, competing in the JEGS All-Star category, where he won the Sportsman of the Year Award.

ARCA Menards Series West
In 2020, Hacker signed with Fast Track Racing with a collaboration with Cram Racing Enterprises for one race in the ARCA Menards Series West, the Arizona Lottery 100 at ISM Raceway. He started 24th and finished 15th.

ARCA Menards Series
On August 28, 2020, Hacker announced on Twitter that he would be competing part-time in the NASCAR Camping World Truck Series in 2021 for an unknown amount of races, and two ARCA Menards Series races for Cram Racing Enterprises starting at Daytona. On January 11, 2021, Hacker had tested positive for COVID-19, and was forced to quarantine, missing the ARCA test session at Daytona. Due to missing the crucial test session, this eliminated Hacker from competing at Daytona. Hacker was set to make his first official ARCA Menards Series debut at Charlotte Motor Speedway for the 2021 General Tire 150. Hacker started 12th and finished 10th, his first career top 10 in his first ARCA Menards Series start in 2021.

NASCAR Craftsman Truck Series
On June 1, 2021, Hacker announced on Twitter that he would run his first truck race with Cram Racing Enterprises at Nashville Superspeedway on June 18. However, two days later, he would announce that he and Cram Racing Enterprises had parted ways due to "unforeseen circumstances." Hacker made his debut in the Camping World Truck Series on August 20, 2021, at World Wide Technology at Gateway in the Toyota 200. He was set to drive the number 34 truck for Reaume Brothers Racing.  Hacker started strong but had an oil line problem which put him multiple laps down.  Hacker started 31st and finished 27th. On September 7, 2021, it was announced that Hacker would drive two races for Niece Motorsports, Las Vegas, and Martinsville.

Hacker remained with Reaume for the 2022 season. On July 21, 2022, it was announced that Hacker would drive for On Point Motorsports in the TSport 200 at Lucas Oil Indianapolis Raceway Park, with sponsorship coming from TJ's Team Foundation.

Personal life
Hacker is known as the first NASCAR driver born with a Brachial Plexus injury (nerve damage) and has weak and limited movement in his left arm. He's had three surgeries, and years of occupational and physical therapies, and still struggles with arm movement.  Hacker has raised money that has helped pay for nearly 50 kids to attend a Brachial Plexus Injury camp. This allows kids to meet others with the same disability and to receive support from each other and hear inspirational stories from others that have suffered from this. Hacker was one of those speakers in 2014. After his first top 10 in the ARCA Menards series, Twitter showed its support for the young driver, granting him tons of fans. Hacker would name the newly found fanbase "HackNation".

Motorsports career results

NASCAR
(key) (Bold – Pole position awarded by qualifying time. Italics – Pole position earned by points standings or practice time. * – Most laps led.)

Craftsman Truck Series

 Season still in progress
 Ineligible for series points

ARCA Menards Series
(key) (Bold – Pole position awarded by qualifying time. Italics – Pole position earned by points standings or practice time. * – Most laps led. ** – All laps led.)

ARCA Menards Series West

References

External links
 
 

Living people
1999 births
Racing drivers from Indiana
Racing drivers from Indianapolis
NASCAR drivers
ARCA Menards Series drivers
Sportspeople from Indiana